Symphony No. 74 in E major, Hoboken 1/74, is a symphony by Joseph Haydn composed in 1780 or 1781.

Movements
The symphony is scored for flute, two oboes, bassoon, two horns and strings.  There are four movements:

Vivace assai, 
Adagio cantabile in B major, 
Menuetto & Trio: Allegretto, 
Finale: Allegro assai, 

The first movement opens in standard Italian style with three loud chords followed by a quiet response.  The second theme group is based on an inversion of the quiet response.

The second movement opens like a serenade with muted violins playing a melody over a guitar-like accompaniment in the cello.  What follows is a set of three loosely structured variations which avoid the simple strophic pattern of previous sets by allowing the lead-ins and interludes to overlap and a coda which features a small fugato.

The minuet features Lombard rhythms and the trio lets the first violin and the bassoon carry the melody.

The finale is gigue-like and in sonata form.

Notes

References
Haydn: Chronicle and Works, 5 vols, (Bloomington and London: Indiana University Press, 1976– ) v. 2, Haydn at Eszterhaza, 1766–1790
Oxford Composer Companions: Haydn, ed. David Wyn Jones, Oxford University Press, 2002. 

Symphony 074
Compositions in E-flat major
1780 compositions
1781 compositions